Tramošnica may refer to:

 Donja Tramošnica, a village in the municipality of Gradačac, Bosnia and Herzegovina
 Gornja Tramošnica, a village in the municipality of Gradačac, Bosnia and Herzegovina